Lolland (formerly spelled Laaland, literally "low land") is the fourth largest island of Denmark, with an area of . Located in the Kattegat, it is part of Region Sjælland (Region Zealand). As of 1 January 2022, it has 57,618 inhabitants.

Overview
The island has been an important communication highway, among others for Nazi Germany during World War II. Historically, sugar beet has been grown in Lolland. Sugar is still a major industry, visible from the large number of sugar beet fields.

The largest town of Lolland is Nakskov, with 12,600 residents. Other main towns are Maribo (6,000 residents), which hosts the seat of the Diocese of Lolland and Falster, Sakskøbing (3,500 residents) and Rødby (2,500 residents).

Since January 1, 2007, Lolland has been administered by two municipalities, Lolland covering the western two thirds, and Guldborgsund uniting the eastern third with the neighbouring island Falster.

Lolland has motor and railway links both to the island of Falster to the east and to Germany (the German island Fehmarn, linked to the mainland) via ferry. European route E47 links Copenhagen to Hamburg (Germany) via Lolland.

Transport
Route E47 from Copenhagen crosses the Guldborgsund strait between Lolland and Falster via a modern tunnel, but the motorway currently terminates at Rødbyhavn where a ferry carries vehicles to Fehmarn. Trains formerly used this ferry as well as part of the Vogelfluglinie. During construction of the Fehmarn Belt Fixed Link however, they currently take the longer way to the mainland via the Great Belt Bridge, then Funen and Jutland.

The governments of Denmark and Germany plan to connect Lolland with Fehmarn by a future immersed tunnel, the Fehmarn Belt Fixed Link.

Two older bridges also span the strait between Lolland and Falster, the Frederick IX Bridge and Guldborgsund Bridge at the northern end of the strait. Frederick IX bridge is the railway bridge to Falster.

Demography

Towns and villages
Population 1 January 2014.

Attractions

Among the attractions of the island are the 19th century Fuglsang Manor, and the neighbouring Fuglsang Art Museum, which opened in 2008. Knuthenborg Safari Park north of Maribo is the largest safari park in Northern Europe and the holiday resort Lalandia is a giant indoor water park. Furthermore, Middelaldercentret is an open-air museum on the most eastern part of the island, just outside Nykøbing Falster. The Centre is an experimental living history museum and it contains a reconstructed part of a medieval town from around 1400. It is among the most authentic reconstructions of the medieval period in Europe, and holds both the largest and the oldest trebuchets in the world.

Lolland has many sandy beaches and areas with summer houses, which are primarily visited by German tourists.

See also
 List of Danish islands
 Nearby islands: Falster, Fejø, Femø, Askø, Vejrø.
 Lolland Hydrogen Community
 Hoby treasure

References

 Tageo.com, "VESTSJAELLAND DENMARK Geography Population" (coordinates), 2007, webpage: Tageo-index.
 Denmark Postal codes, webpage: Postnumre-DK.
 Tele.dk Denmark detailed road map, webpage: Tele-DK-Danmark.

External links

 Map of Lolland and Falster

 
Islands of Denmark
Geography of Guldborgsund Municipality
Geography of Lolland Municipality
Region Zealand
Danish islands in the Baltic
Lolland Municipality
Guldborgsund Municipality